A  is a territorial subdivision of certain Italian towns. It has been later used as a synonymous of neighbourhood, and an Italian town can be now subdivided into a larger number of quartieri. The Swiss town of Lugano (in the Italian-speaking canton of Ticino) is also subdivided into quarters.

The English word "quarter" to mean an urban neighbourhood (e.g. the French Quarter in New Orleans, Louisiana) is derived from the cognate old French word "quartier".

Other Italian towns with other than four official neighbourhoods are frequently divided into analogous terzieri (3) or sestieri (6); some towns merely refer to these neighborhoods by the non-number-specific rioni. Quartieri, terzieri, sestieri, rioni, and their analogues are usually no longer administrative divisions of these towns, but historical and traditional communities. Sometimes towns maintain traditional cultural events linked to quartieri: a notable case is the palio of Siena. Only in a few Italian cities, like in Florence and Bologna, a quartiere is also an administrative subdivision.

See also
 Circoscrizione
 Contrade
 Frazione
 Località
 Rione
Rioni of Rome
 Sestiere
 Terziere

References

 
.
Subdivisions of Italy
Subdivisions of Ticino